Lieutenant General Dr. Madhuri Kanitkar, PVSM, AVSM, VSM is a retired General Officer in the Indian Army. She is the third woman in the Indian Armed Forces to be promoted to a Three-star rank, after Lieutenant General Punita Arora and Air Marshal Padma Bandopadhyay. She served as the Deputy Chief of Integrated Defence Staff (Medical) under the Chief of Defence Staff.
Kanitkar also serves on the Prime Minister's Science, Technology and Innovation Advisory Council (PM-STIAC).

On 6 July 2021, she was appointed the Vice-Chancellor of the Maharashtra University of Health Sciences, Nashik by the Governor of Maharashtra. She took over this appointment after retiring from the Army in October 2021.

Early life and education
She was born into a Goud Saraswat Brahmin family, with three daughters, in Dharwad , Karnataka 1960. Her grandmother and grandfather were both medical doctors. She joined the Armed Forces Medical College, Pune in 1978. She placed first in Pune University in all three phases of her MBBS. She was awarded the President's Gold Medal for the best outgoing student of the graduate wing in academics and extra-curricular activities, apart from the Kalinga Trophy for excellence in academics.

Military career
Kanitkar was commissioned in the Army Medical Corps in December 1982. She did her post-graduation in 1990, earning the Doctor of Medicine degree in Pediatrics. Post that she underwent training in Pediatric Nephrology at the All India Institute of Medical Sciences, New Delhi. Kanitkar has also completed fellowships at the National University Hospital, Singapore and the Great Ormond Street Hospital, London and the FAIMER fellowship in Medical Education.

She has tenanted appointments of Associate Professor, Professor and Head of Department of Pediatrics at the Armed Forces Medical College, Pune. She has also served as a Professor at the Army College of Medical Sciences and at the Army hospital (Research & Referral).
Kanitkar was instrumental in setting up the first Pediatric Nephrology service in the Army Medical Corps and has served as the President of The Indian Society of Pediatric Nephrology. 
Kanitkar has served as the Deputy Director General Armed Forces Medical Services (Dy DGAFMS) in the office of the DGAFMS in New Delhi.

On 28 January 2017, she assumed the office of Dean and Deputy Commandant of her alma-mater Armed Forces Medical College, Pune. Kanitkar then served as Major General Medical at the Northern Command at Udhampur. Kanitkar was promoted to the rank of Lieutenant General on 29 February 2020. The Director General Armed Forces Medical Services (DGAFMS) and her husband pipped the epaulettes of her new rank.

Personal life
Her husband, Lieutenant General Rajeev Kanitkar, is a retired General Officer and last served as the Quartermaster General of the Indian Army. They are the first couple in the Indian Armed Forces to achieve the three-star rank.

Awards and decorations
Kanitkar has been awarded the GOC-in-C Commendation Card once and the Chief of the Army Staff
Commendation Card five times. She was also awarded the Vishisht Seva Medal in 2014, the Ati Vishisht Seva Medal in 2018, and the Param Vishisht Seva Medal in January 2022.

See also
 Women in the Indian Armed Forces
 Punita Arora
 Padma Bandopadhyay
 Sheila S. Mathai
 Rajshree Ramasethu
 Arti Sarin

References

Indian Army personnel
Female generals of the Indian Army
Female army generals
Living people
1961 births
Women in 21st-century warfare
Women in warfare post-1945
Indian female military personnel